Bjørn Lødemel (born 19 August 1958) is a Norwegian politician and a member of the Conservative Party of Norway (Høyre). He was elected to the Stortinget from Sogn og Fjordane in 2009. He had been mayor of Hornindal municipality since 1995, and a member of the council since 1991. He has also been regional council leader, and is the leader of Sogn og Fjordane Conservative Party.

Lødemel has previously worked in business and the military, and has worked in factories and been a self-employed businessman.

Storting committees 
2009–2013 member of Energy and environment committee

External links 

Bjørn Lødemel at Sogn og Fjordane Høgre

1958 births
Living people
Members of the Storting
Conservative Party (Norway) politicians
21st-century Norwegian politicians